Ceratophyllus liae is a species of flea in the family Ceratophyllidae. It was described by Wenzhen and Chao in 1990.

References 

Ceratophyllidae
Insects described in 1990